Pakize İzzet Tarzi (1910 – 18 October 2004) was a Turkish physician. She is renowned for being the first female gynecologist in the Republic of Turkey.

Early life
Tarzi was born in Ottoman Aleppo in 1910. Her father was the Inspectorates-General of the Ziraat Bankası in Aleppo. The family moved to Adana once the British captured Damascus in 1918, and then to Konya once the French took control of Adana. She studied her secondary education at the Sörler Okulu and then decided to pursue a career as a doctor during her studies at the Bursa American Girls College. She finished her studies in Medicine in 1932.

On 21 July 1949, she opened the first women's clinic, the "Pakize İ. Tarzi Kliniği",  in Şişli district of Istanbul, Turkey.

She is also known as the very first Turkish woman, who swam across the Bosphorous in the 1930s.

Personal life
In 1935, she married Fettah Tarzi, who was the nephew of the Afghan King Amanullah Khan. Their daughter, Zeynep Tarzi, was the wife of the Imperial Ottoman Prince Ertuğrul Osman.

Tarzi died at the age of 94.

References

1910 births
2004 deaths
People from Aleppo
Turkish gynaecologists
Turkish women physicians
Turkish physicians
20th-century Turkish physicians
20th-century women physicians